Parmouti 25 - Coptic Calendar - Parmouti 27

The twenty-sixth day of the Coptic month of Parmouti, the eighth month of the Coptic year. In common years, this day corresponds to April 21, of the Julian Calendar, and May 4, of the Gregorian Calendar. This day falls in the Coptic Season of Shemu, the season of the Harvest.

Commemorations

Martyrs 

 The martyrdom of Saint Sousnyos

Saints 

 The departure of Pope John VII, 78th Patriarch of the See of Saint Mark

References 

Days of the Coptic calendar